Nagare may refer to:

People named Nagare
 Masayuki Nagare (1923–2018), a modernist Japanese sculptor

Other uses
 Mazda Nagare, a concept car
 Nagare, a villain in the anime and manga series Naruto
 Nagare Akatsuki, an anime character
 Nagare Namikawa, a video game character
 Nagare, a Python-based software framework for Web Application Development
 Suiseiken Nagare, the sword of Kamen Rider Blades, a character from the Japanese tokusatsu series Kamen Rider Saber